Gmina Wierzbica is a rural gmina (administrative district) in Chełm County, Lublin Voivodeship, in eastern Poland.

Villages
Gmina Wierzbica contains the villages and settlements of Bakus-Wanda, Busówno, Busówno-Kolonia, Buza, Chylin, Chylin Mały, Chylin Wielki, Helenów, Kamienna Góra, Kamienna Góra-Gajówka, Karczunek, Kozia Góra, Ochoża, Ochoża-Pniaki, Olchowiec, Olchowiec-Kolonia, Pniówno, Staszyce, Święcica, Syczyn, Tarnów, Terenin, Werejce, Wierzbica, Wierzbica-Osiedle, Władysławów, Wólka Tarnowska, Wólka Tarnowska-Osada and Wygoda.

Neighbouring gminas
Gmina Wierzbica is bordered by the town of Rejowiec Fabryczny and by the gminas of Chełm, Cyców, Hańsk, Sawin, Siedliszcze and Urszulin.

References
Polish official population figures 2006

Gminas in Lublin Voivodeship
Chełm County